Thomas Aloysius Murray  (March 23, 1867 - June 26, 1939) was a Major League Baseball player. Murray played in one game in the 1894 season with the Philadelphia Phillies.

External links
Baseball-Reference page

Philadelphia Phillies players
1867 births
1939 deaths
Baseball players from Paterson, New Jersey
19th-century baseball players